is a Japanese manga series written and illustrated by Yasuhiro Nightow. It revolves around a young photographer named Leonardo Watch, who obtains 'the All Seeing Eyes of the Gods' at the cost of his sister's eyesight. After the incident, Leonardo moves to the city of Hellsalem's Lot to join an organization known as Libra to fight several monsters as well as terrorists.

Nightow first published a one-shot chapter in Shueisha's shōnen manga magazine Jump Square in May 2008. A three-chapter series, with the subtitle Mafūgai Kessha, was published in the same magazine from January to March 2009. Blood Blockade Battlefront was later serialized in Jump SQ.19 from May 2010 to February 2015, when the magazine ceased publication; Shueisha collected its chapters in 10 tankōbon volumes. A direct sequel, titled Blood Blockade Battlefront: Back 2 Back was serialized in Jump SQ.Crown from July 2015 to January 2018, when the magazine ceased publication, and the series was transferred to Jump SQ.Rise, where it ran from April 2018 to April 2022; its chapters were collected in 10 tankōbon volumes. A third series, titled Blood Blockade Battlefront: Beat 3 Peat started in Jump SQ.Rise in October 2022.

A 12-episode anime television series produced by Bones was broadcast from April to October 2015. A 12-episode second season was broadcast from October to December 2017.

In North America, the manga has been licensed for English language release by Dark Horse Comics, while the anime series has been licensed by Funimation. Both the manga and anime were well received by publications due to its story and characters.

Plot

Blood Blockade Battlefront centers around the crime fighting organization "Libra" and their battles in Hellsalem's Lot, formerly known as New York City. Hellsalem's Lot was created when a portal to the "Beyond" opened, becoming a paranormal melting pot of monsters, magic and the everyday mundane life, and it is up to Libra to clear the streets of trouble and prevent the horrors of this city from spreading to the outside world.

Media

Manga

Blood Blockade Battlefront is written and illustrated by Yasuhiro Nightow. Nightow first published a one-shot chapter in Shueisha's shōnen manga magazine Jump Square on May 2, 2008. It only featured very few members of the final cast and had a much different tone, with more emphasis on it being a vampire hunting story in a contemporary city. A three-chapter series, titled , was serialized in Jump Square from January 5 to March 4, 2009. Another one-shot chapter was published in Jump SQ.M (Jump Square Masterpiece) vol.002, released on October 23, 2009. Blood Blockade Battlefront was then serialized in the then brand new magazine Jump SQ.19, which first issue was released on May 19, 2010. The series finished with the 18th and last issue of Jump SQ.19, released on February 19, 2015. Shueisha collected its chapters in ten tankōbon volumes, released from January 4, 2010, to April 3, 2015. In 2010, the series was licensed for English release by Dark Horse Comics.

A direct sequel, titled Blood Blockade Battlefront: Back 2 Back, started in the first issue of Jump SQ.Crown on July 17, 2015. The magazine ceased publication on January 19, 2018, and the series continued publication in the first ever issue of Jump SQ.Rise, released on April 16, 2018. The series finished on April 28, 2022. Shueisha collected its chapters in ten tankōbon volumes, released from January 4, 2016, to August 4, 2022.

A third series, titled Blood Blockade Battlefront: Beat 3 Peat, started in Jump SQ.Rise on October 26, 2022.

Anime

The manga was adapted into an anime television series produced by studio Bones and directed by Rie Matsumoto as first announced in May 2014. The first volume was released on January 4, 2010; ten volumes have been released as of April 3, 2015.  Funimation licensed the series to stream on its official website. Following Sony's acquisition of Crunchyroll, the series was moved to Crunchyroll. The anime adaptation premiered on April 4, 2015. The series was licensed by Madman Entertainment and AnimeLab for an English release. The final episode was originally scheduled for broadcast on July 4, but was delayed further due to exceeding the length of its normal 30 minute timeslot. It was eventually scheduled for October 4, 2015. A 25-minute original video animation titled "King of the Restaurant of Kings" was bundled with the official Blood Blockade Battlefront guidebook that was released on June 3, 2016.

A second season was announced in December 2016. It was broadcast from October 7, 2017 to December 24, 2017, running for 12 episodes. A 24-minute original animation DVD was bundled with the fifth volume of the Blood Blockade Battlefront Back 2 Back manga which was released on July 4, 2018, with Shigehito Takayanagi and Bones returning from the second season of the anime series to direct and animate the OAD, respectively.

Stage play
In the sixth volume of Blood Blockade Battle Front Back 2 Back, it was revealed that a live action stage play inspired by the manga was being produced. It ran at The Galaxy Theatre in Tokyo from November 2 to 10, 2019 and at Umeda Arts Theater Dramacity from November 14 to 17, 2019. Daisuke Nishida (Hakuōki, Sengoku Basara, Blue Exorcist stage productions) directed and wrote the play.

Reception
The manga series of Blood Blockade Battlefront received generally good critical response. Brigid Alverson from MTV Geek criticized the artwork for being hard to follow and stated "it boils down to a matter of taste. Blood Blockade Battleground is a good choice for readers who like a lot of action and don't mind being dropped into the middle of the story, without a lot of setup." On the other hand, The Fandom Post's John Rose praised the artwork more specifically the monsters' designs. He highly recommended it to Triguns readers as well as superhero comic reader, sci-fi hero and Futurama fans. Several of the volumes have also appeared in rankings for bestselling manga.

The anime adaptation of the series has received generally positive reviews. Jacob Hope Chapman from Anime News Network praised the cast and studio Bones' work. Additionally, he liked the consistency in quality and commented "The contiguous threads laced through these episodic adventures are beginning to converge fast, and while I can't see the full picture yet, I know Rie Matsumoto is building the anime-original material of Leo's romance into something special. The animation continues to be jaw-dropping. The music continues to be soul-warming. There's never enough time in one writeup to talk about everything that makes the episode so damn good. Blood Blockade Battlefront continues to be The Very Best." Jarius Taylor from the Fandom Post called it "both ridiculously cool and ridiculously weird" and praised the cast like Chapman. In a later review he said "It’s still not entirely clear what this show is going for yet but for now it’s a good ride and I have more than enough faith in the people behind it to believe the destination will be worthwhile." Rachael Verret, a writer from The Mary Sue, gave the series a perfect score having pointed out its "energy and joviality" seen through the cast and the ending sequences which reminded her of another series, Baccano!. Similarly, Chapman wrote an article titled "Three Reasons Why Blood Blockade Battlefront is the Best Show of the Spring" commenting "It's the coolest, cutest, and cleverest anime I've seen in a long time, easily the best new show of the Spring 2015."

The first DVD of the series sold 4,784 units during its debut. Meanwhile, the first Blu-ray sold 12,171 units in its first week of release. For the Newtype preliminary awards for 2015, the series was sixth in the category "Sound" while fourth in the category "Theme Song" for "Sugar Song to Bitter Step." In the category "Best Mascot", Sonic ranked first. In another poll by the Japanese magazine Entermix, the series was voted as the second most popular one.

References

External links
 
 
 

2015 anime television series debuts
2017 anime television series debuts
Action anime and manga
Anime series based on manga
Bones (studio)
Comics set in New York City
Crunchyroll anime
Dark Horse Comics titles
Funimation
Manga adapted into television series
Post-apocalyptic anime and manga
Shōnen manga
Shueisha franchises
Shueisha manga
Television shows set in New York City
Toho Animation
Urban fantasy anime and manga